Aparamán-tepui is the westernmost of the four main tepuis of the Los Testigos chain in Bolívar, Venezuela. While the other three tepuis share a common slope area, Aparamán is derived from a separate basement. Its mostly bare summit plateau is highly dissected, presenting difficulties even for helicopter landings.

In his 1978 book, La Vegetación del Mundo Perdido, Charles Brewer-Carías referred to a smaller lateral peak of Aparamán-tepui as Murochiopán-tepui, though this name is now more commonly applied to the major peak immediately east of it.

See also
 Distribution of Heliamphora

References

Tepuis of Venezuela
Mountains of Venezuela
Mountains of Bolívar (state)